Stećak or Stećci in plural form is the name for monumental medieval tombstones, that lie scattered across Bosnia and Herzegovina, and the border parts of Croatia, Montenegro and Serbia. An estimated 60,000 are found within the borders of modern Bosnia and Herzegovina and the rest of 10,000 are found in what are today Croatia (4,400), Montenegro (3,500), and Serbia (2,100), at more than 3,300 odd sites with over 90% in poor condition.

Appearing in the mid 12th century, with the first phase in the 13th century, the custom of cutting and using stećci tombstones reached its peak in the 14th and 15th century, before being discontinued in the very early 16th century during the Ottoman conquest of Bosnia and Herzegovina. They were a common tradition amongst Bosnian, Catholic and Orthodox Church followers alike, and were used by both Slavic and the Vlach populations.

Stećci are inscribed on the World Heritage List by UNESCO since 2016, with a selection of some 4,000 individual monoliths, grouped in necropolises at 28 locations, of which 22 in Bosnia and Herzegovina, two in Croatia, three in Montenegro, and three in Serbia. The one of the best preserved collection of these tombstones is Radimlja, west of Stolac in Bosnia and Herzegovina.

Etymology
The word itself is a contracted form of the older word *stojećak, which is derived from the South Slavic verb stajati (engl. stand). It literally means the "tall, standing thing". In Herzegovina they are also called as mašeti / mašete (Italian massetto meaning "big rock", or Turkish meşhet/mešhed meaning "tombstone of a fallen hero"), in Central and Western Bosnia as mramori / mramorje / mramorovi (marble), while in Serbia and Montenegro as usađenik (implantation). On the stećci inscriptions they are called as bilig (mark), kamen bilig (stone mark), kâm / kami / kamen (stone), hram (shrine), zlamen (sign), kuća (house), raka (pit), greb/grob (grave). In 1495 lectionary they are recorded as kamy (stone).

Although under the name stećak is meant high monolithic standing stones (i.e. sanduk and sljemenjak form), in the 20th century the word stećak was accepted in science as general term, including for plate tombstones (i.e. ploče). The original reference to the word stećak itself is uncertain and seems to be modern invention as it can only be traced from the note by Ivan Kukuljević Sakcinski from 1851, dictionary by Vuk Karadžić from 1852 (in the first edition from 1812 the term did not exist), although he contradicted himself as the commoners from Zagvozd called them starovirsko ("of the old faith"), dictionary by Bogoslav Šulek from 1860 and so on, while academic dictionaries mention it only from 1956/58. It is considered that the term was usually used in East Herzegovina and in the area of Stari Vlah in Serbia. Until the very early 20th century there was wandering in terminology, and some scholars proposed general terms like nadgrobni biljezi (gravestone markers) and mramorje (marble) to be more appropriate.

The term stećak is uncommon in regional dialects and without etiological value, and semantically incorrect and contradicting as it derives from the verb "to stand", while the chest-type to which it refers predominantly is laid down, while another sub-type of pillars and crosses is the one predominantly upright; this upright or standing sub-type does not amount even 5% of the overall number of stećci; in the original stećci inscriptions they are most often called as kami (meaning "stone" regardless of the form), thus some scholars proposed the term kamik (pl. kamici) for all forms of headstones, while stećak would mean only the upright sub-type. The term kamik is more close to the original meaning and sometime is used instead of stećak in professional literature.

The stećci area or cemetery folk names show respect and admiration for their dimensions, age or representations: Divsko groblje (Giants’ cemetery), Mašete (big stones), Mramori/Mramorje (marble blocks), Grčko groblje (Greek cemetery), Tursko groblje (Turkish cemetery), Kaursko groblje (Giaour’s cemetery).

Characteristics

Definition

They are characteristic for the territory of present-day Herzegovina, central Bosnia and Podrinje in Bosnia and Herzegovina, and Dalmatia in Croatia, and some minor parts of Montenegro, Kosovo and Western Serbia, Northwestern Bosnia, and Croatia (Lika and Slavonia).

Stećci are described as horizontal and vertical tombstones, made of stone, with a flat or gable-top surface, with or without a pedestal. The common classification was established by Dmitrij Sergejevski in 1952, who divided them into recumbent stećci and standing stećci. The systematization of stećci is not currently complete. According to Šefik Bešlagić, there are seven main shapes: slab, chest, chest with pedestal, ridge/gable, ridge/gable with pedestal, pillar, and cross; while according to Dubravko Lovrenović, there are nine types in Radimlja: slab, slab with pedestal, chest, chest with pedestal, tall chest, tall chest with pedestal, sarcophagus (i.e. ridge/gable), sarcophagus with pedestal, cruciform.

For instance, in Bosnia and Herzegovina, according to UNESCO, "about 40,000 chests, 13,000 slabs, 5,500 gabled tombstones, 2,500 pillars/obelisks, 300 cruciform tombstones and about 300 tombstones of indeterminate shape have been identified. Of these, more than 5,000 bear carved decorations".

The chronology established by Marian Wenzel assumes they developed from the plate headstones, the oldest one dating back to 1220 (the first were probably erected sometime in the mid-12th century), the monumental ones emerged somewhere around 1360, those with visual representations around 1435–1477, and that total production ended circa 1505. However, some consider that it lasted until the late 16th century, with rare examples that continued until the 18th century. Stećci in the form of chest (sanduk) and ridge/saddle-roofed (sljemenjak) do not seem to have appeared before the middle or the end of the 14th century (1353-1477), while the remaining two basic forms – the upright pillar (stup) and cross (krstača / križina), no earlier than mid-15th century. In the case of the latter, upright or standing forms could be influenced by the nišan – the upright monolithic stones on top of the Muslim (Turkish) graves, which had already emerged by the end of the 14th century in conquered parts of Macedonia and Serbia. This form is predominantly found in Serbia and Eastern Bosnia.

The initial stage of their development, which included simple recumbent plates or slabs isn't specific for the region, but it is of broad West Mediterranean origin, and as such the term stećak (implying the chest and ridge form) is misleading for all tombstone forms. The slabs were typical for a kind of burial in the West Mediterranean world of the 14th and 15th centuries, which had a special method of production and ornamentation in the Balkans, customized according to the stonemasonry skills and microenvironment. They they were initially made by the feudal nobility who wanted to affirm individual's prestige and power, sometimes also decorated with their coat of arms, while later this tradition was embraced and adopted by other social classes like the Vlachs who experined social-economical growth and almost exclusively built them from the mid-15th century on.

Decorations
A fraction of stećci (384) bear inscriptions, mostly in Cyrillic, some in Glagolitic and Latin script. The observed Shtokavian dialect of Serbo-Croatian has some archaic phrases, mainly characterized by Ikavian while toward the end by Ikavian-Ijekavian yat reflex. The inscriptions can be roughly divided into those of: religious phrase, description of heroic death, information of the deceased, information of the deceased's relatives and circumstances of death, information with only a personal name (sometimes with smith-pupil name), and a moral (or religious) lesson. The last are mostly brazen reminders of wisdom and mortality, relay a dread of death, more anxiety than peace.

The most remarkable feature is their decorative motifs roughly divided in six groups which complement each other: social symbols, religious symbols, images of posthumous kolo, figural images, clear ornaments, and unclassified motifs (mostly symbolic, geometrical, or damaged). Many of them remain enigmatic to this day; spirals, arcades, rosettes, vine leaves and grapes, lilium, stars (often six-pointed) and crescent Moons are among the images that appear. Figural images include processions of deer, horse, dancing the kolo, hunting, chivalric tournaments, and, most famously, the image of the man with his right hand raised, perhaps in a gesture of fealty.

A series of visual representations on the tombstones can not be simplistically interpreted as real scenes from the life, and symbolic explanation is still considered by the scholarship. The shield on the tombstones, usually with the crossbar, crescent and star, cannot be a coat of arms, neither the lilium which is stylized is used in the heraldic sense. On one stećak is displayed tied lion and above him winged dragon. Already in 1979, historian Hadžijahić noted that the horsemen are not riding with reins, yet (if are not hunting) their hands are free and pointed to the sky, implying possible cult significance. In 1985, Maja Miletić noted the symbolic and religious character of the stećak scenes. All the "life scenes" are considered to be part of ceremonial. Several scholars concluded that the motifs, as well the tradition of a posthumous cult, show mixing of Romanized Illyrians and Early Slavs tradition with Christianity. Alojz Benac noted that the displays of a sole horse with a snake, as well a sole deer with a bird, symbolize the soul of the deceased going to the otherworld, which representations are resembling those found on Iapydes artefacts. The Illyrian god Medaurus is described as riding on horseback and carrying a lance.

Of all the animals, the deer is the most represented, and mostly is found on stećci in Herzegovina. According to Dragoslav Srejović, the spread of Christianity did not cause the disappearance of old cult and belief in sacred deer. Wenzel considered that it led the deceased to the underworld. Historian Šefik Bešlagić synthesized the representations of deer: sometimes accompanied by a bird (often on the back or horns), cross or lilium, frequently are shown series of deer or doe, as well with a bow and arrow, dog and hunter(s) with a spear or sword (often on a horse). It is displayed in hunting scenes, as well some kolo processions led by a man who is riding a deer. There scenes where deer calmly approach the hunter, or deer with enormous size and sparse horns. Most of the depictions of "deer hunting" are facing west, which had the symbolic meaning for death and the otherworld. In the numerous hunting scenes, in only one a deer is wounded (the stećak has some anomalies), indicating an unrealistic meaning. In the Roman and Parthian-Sasanian art, hunted animals are mortally wounded, and the deer is only one of many, while on stećci is the only hunted animal.

The motifs of kolo (in total 132) procession along with a deer, and its specific direction of dancing, although not always easily identifiable, show it is a mortal dance compared to cheerful dance. From Iapydes urns, up to present-day women in Bosnia and Herzegovina, and Montenegro, remorseful dances are played in the westward direction toward sunset. In Eastern Bosnia and Herzegovina so-called Ljeljenovo kolo, with ljeljen local name for jelen (deer) implying jelenovo kolo, is danced by making the gate of the raised hand and ringleader of these gates tries to pull all kolo dancers through them until the kolo is entangled, after that, playing in the opposite direction, until the kolo is unravelled. Its origin is in mortuary ritual guiding the soul to another world and the meaning of the renewal of life.

The vast regional, but scarce (usually only one) in-graveyard distribution mostly in the center or some notable position of cross-type stećci (križine), and their almost exclusively ornament of the crescent Moon and stars, could indicate cemetery label for specific (pagan) religious affiliation. The symbolism of the Moon and stars (Sun), which are often found on them, could be traced to a combination of pagan and Christian beliefs,  six-pointed star represent Venus (in Slavic mythology called Danica) and with Moon could represent "astral marriage", or even Mithraism which had old Mazdakism belief that the dead body goes to the Moon and souls to the Sun, while some considered a connection between astral symbols with the position of celestial bodies at the time of death of the deceased.

Carving
They were carved by kovač / klesar (smith, mason; in the sense of Latin faber, "master"), while the inscriptions, probably as a template, were compiled by dijak / pisar (pupil, scribe). Until now are known 33 personal names of masons, among whom most notable is Grubač due to quality and being both a mason and scribe. He made four stećci in Boljuni and four stećci in Opličići near Stolac. The most notable scribe was Semorad who also worked around Stolac. It is considered that the masons studied the craft in Dalmatia and Ragusa, and from them those in hinterland.

Stećci were mostly carved out of huge blocks, mostly of limestone. Location in the vicinity of a quarry was most significant for the cemetery. Some stećci weighed more than 29 tonnes, and it is supposed they were transported by horse or ox carriage and the heaviest with a combination of sledges and flat billets. They were placed directly above the pit, often in cardinal direction west–east, therefore so were the deceased. Seemingly it was related to the Sun path and was of importance that the dead watch the rising Sun.

Stećci in Bosnia and Herzegovina can be roughly divided on two stonemasonry schools Herzegovian (sarcophagi with arcades, figurative scenes, a wealth of motifs) and East Bosnian (sarcophagi in the form of chalets, floral motives). The leading position had schools on the territory of Herzegovina, with center around Stolac, in area of Trebinje and Bileća, Gacko and Nevesinje. The fourth workshop was in the area of Konjic, while the fifth around Lištica. The stonemasons center in Western Bosnia was between Kupres and Duvno, in Central Bosnia around Travnik, while in Eastern Bosnia were four workshops, one between Kladanj, Olovo and Ilijaš, second around Zvornik, third in Ludmer, and fourth around Rogatica.

In Croatia supposedly were two workshops, one in Cista Velika, and second in Čepikuće. Local characteristic of stećci in the territory around Cetina river in Croatia is their rare ornateness, of which only 8-10% have simple decoration. Those from upper Cetina are smaller and by type and style relate to those from Knin and Livno, while those from mid Cetina are more monumental. Specific plate stećci were found in village Bitelić which are decorated with identical geometric ornament, not found in Dalmatia nor in Bosnia and Herzegovina, however by the nature of ornament and surface treatment is considered possible connection with several monuments near Church of St. Peter in Nikšić, Montenegro.

In Montenegro could have existed around Nikšić, while in Glisnica and Vaškovo in Pljevlja Municipality. According to Bešlagić, in Serbia seemingly were no specific centers yet the masons arrived from Bosnia and Herzegovina.

Origin
There are different and still inconclusive theories on their cultural-artistic, religious and ethnic affiliation. According to common thesis, especially represented by Bešlagić, stećci are an original Bosnian-Herzegovinian cultural-artistic medieval phenomenon. Some scholars like Milovan Gavazzi (1978) examined a much broader context, and considered their connection to megalithic tradition of the region and Eurasia from prehistoric and contemporary period. Some scholars considered that the chest form could have been inspired by Romanesque and Gothic houses from the coastal cities, while the ridge form by medieval Christian sarcophagus or local Bosnian wooden house. According to Lovrenović's synthesis it is part of a wider West Mediterranean origin and affiliation. It is established that they are mainly related to mountainous places which became deserted over a period of time because of migrations caused by new social events and Ottoman occupation.

Religion
Since the middle of the 19th century, specifically since the 1875 thesis by Arthur Evans, many scholars including Alexander Soloviev, Kosta Hörmann and Ćiro Truhelka have initially argued that they were related to the origin of the Bosnian Church i.e. Bogomils or other dualist groups. Others have asserted that the church was actually founded by Franciscan friars from the Catholic Church. However, Benac noted that the stećci were not built in First Bulgarian Empire and that in Central Bosnia where were centers of Kingdom of Bosnia and Bosnian Church is smaller concentration, as well higher number of stećci of poor design, but also older date. The exclusive relation between stećci and Bogomils was propagated from the late 19th century due to political and ideological reasons, like by Béni Kállay and Austro-Hungarian authorities who promoted post-Ottoman and pan-Bosnian identity because since 1878 the territory was part of Austro-Hungarian administration, rather than scientific reasons. Although it was already questioned in 1899 by Kosta Hörmann the first director of National Museum of Bosnia and Herzegovina, for almost a century it was a predominant theory in international historiography.

Since the mid-20th century many scholars like Marian Wenzel, once the world's leading authority on the art and artifacts of medieval Bosnia and Herzegovina, concluded that the stećci tombstones were a common tradition amongst Catholic, Orthodox and Bosnian Church followers alike. Wenzel's conclusion supported other historians' claims that they reflect a regional cultural phenomenon rather than belonging to a particular religious faith. Sometime the inscriptions/motifs do reveal the confessional affiliation of necropolis/deceased to one of the three Church organizations in medieval Bosnia and Zachlumia. This interconfessionality of stećci is one of their most remarkable features, and indicates high degree of Christianization of medieval Bosnian community. However, it is considered that there is not enough basis to be perceived as exclusively Christian.

Christian Gottlob Wilke sought origins of the symbolic motifs in the old Mediterranean spirituali and religious concepts. Đuro Basler in the artistic expression saw some parallels in late Romanesque art, while in symbolic motifs three components; pre-Christian, Christian and Manichaean (i.e. Bogomil). Bešlagić asserted that those who have raised and decorated them were not completely Christianized because they practiced the old custom of putting attachments with the dead, and many artefacts made of metals, textiles, ceramics and skin, coins, earrings of silver, gilded silver and solid gold have been found in graves beneath stećci. The customs like placing coin in the mouth (Charon's obol), and placing drinking vessel near graves and heads, are from antique time. Tomb pits were mostly used for one burial, but sometimes were for two and more. Based on one stećak inscription in Montenegro, Bešlagić argued that there was a pre-Christian custom of re-burial, in which the bones were washed and returned to the pit.

Ethnic origin
The ethnic identity of the stećci has not yet been fully clarified. Until now the most dominant, but still not fully accepted, theory relates them with the Vlach communities in Bosnia and Herzegovina. Criticism of the theory argues that the monuments in original form wasn't specific for Bosnia and Herzegovina, were initially and after  made by feudal nobility and only in late stages embraced by the Vlachs, the Vlach demographic number was too small, were profane and isolated, that the Vlachs in Late Middle Ages were mostly a social-professional rather than ethnic class, and that the mythological symbols are related to Old Slavic rather than "Vlach" pagan beliefs.

Bešlagić and others related them to formation of Bosnian Kingdom and especially Bogomils; however, the shortage of this theory is in the fact that the Bosnian Kingdom's existence was presumably too short for change in folk tradition, the Bosnian Church existed later and ended sooner than stećci, the Bosnian Church area of influence can not explain them in littoral and Serbian lands, other Bogomils did not build them, many necropolises are located around contemporary church ruins as well some stećci were secondarily embedded into churches and mosques, and that the Bogomils did not respect the symbol of cross, yet on the stećci it is very common. Gradually it was "dismantled and discarded".

Some other scholars proposed unconvincing theories; Ivo Pilar (1918) ideologically argued Croatian origin of medieval Bosnia, later Dominik Mandić considered them to be part of the ritual of burial by the pagan Croats from the Red Croatia, Ante Škobalj similarly argued the Croatian theory. Non-monumental around Cetina were identified with Croats while monumental with migrating Vlachs. Vaso Glušac ideologically argued Serbian-Orthodox origin of both Bosnian Church and stećci, while Vladislav Skarić considered they have represented Old Slavic "eternal home", and that initially were built from wood. Vladimir Ćorović pointed out that the "Old Slavs have not used monoliths or larger blocks of stone to make their apartments, let alone for the grave signs. Even the less for their writing or decorations".

Vlachs

The "autochthonous" Vlach theory was proposed by Bogumil Hrabak (1956) and Marian Wenzel (1962). However, the theory is much older and was first proposed by Arthur Evans in his work Antiquarian Researches in Illyricum (1883). While doing research with Felix von Luschan on stećak graves around Konavle considered that a large number of skulls weren't of Slavic origin yet similar to older "Illyrian" peoples, as well noted that Dubrovnik memorials recorded those parts to be inhabited by the Vlachs until the 15th century. A study of inscriptions on the tombstones showed that individuals from Vlach tribes (like Vlahovići, Pliščići, Predojevići, Bobani, and Drobnjaci) were also buried beneath stećak graves.

Hrabak was the first scholar to connect the historical documents and their relation to the persons mentioned on rare inscriptions on the stećci. In 1953 he concluded that the smith-stonemason Grubač from Boljun necropolis near Stolac built stećak of Bogovac not later than 1477, and that most of the monuments of Herzegovinian Vlachs, and not only Herzegovinian and not only Vlachs, could be dated to the second half of the 15th century. Wenzel in one of her studies researched sixteen stećci with similar dating and historically known persons. She noted the possibility that initially the stone monuments as such could have been introduced by the feudal nobility in the mid-14th century, which tradition was embraced by the Vlach tribes who introduced figural decoration. The termination of the stećci production Wenzel related to the Ottoman invasion and new social circumstances, with the transition of Vlachs and near Slavs to Islam resulting with loss of tribal organization and characteristics of specific ethnic identity.

Sima Ćirković (1964) and Marko Vego (1973) argued that the emergence of the stećci among Vlachs coincides with their social-economical rise, confirmed in region of Zachlumia where is located the most well known necropolis of Radimlja related to the Vlach family Miloradović-Stjepanović from genus Hrabreni. Financial possibilities of ordering such expensive ways of burial among Vlachs are supported and confirmed in the historical documents, with an example of Vlach from Cetina, Ostoja Bogović, who in 1377 paid the cost of burial of Vlach Priboja Papalić for 40 libra. At the time burial in Split costed 4-8 libra, while for a sum of 40 libra could be bought family grave in the church of Franciscan order in Šibenik.

Benac concluded that the distribution of the stećci in the lands at the right Cetina riverbank, in the parts of Dalmatian Zagora, while their absence in the lands left of the river (with graveyards along Early Middle Age churches), show these tombstones in those parts belonged to the Vlach communities. The triangle between Šibenik, Trogir and Knin, as well surroundings of Vrlika and Trilj, which were the main centers of Vlachs, have the most number of stećci in Dalmatia. In 1982, Benac noted that the highest concentration of them is in South Herzegovina (territory of Trebinje, Bileća, Ljubinj and Stolac), where was high concentration of Vlach population. Some of the stećci inscriptions (by anthroponyms) clearly relate them to some Vlach chieftains; Tarah Boljunović from Boljun-Stolac, Vukosav Vlaćević from Vlahovići-Lubinje, Hrabreni and Miloradović in Radimlja-Stolac, as well other distinctive members from Vlach groups like Bobani, Pliščići, Predojevići, Drobnjaci and to such chieftains belong finest monuments.

The occurrence of stećci in the Cetina county is related to the Nelipić noble family efforts to return economic and political power to whom was confiscated Knin in 1345 by king Louis I of Hungary in exchange for Sinj and Cetina county. They thrived with the support from the Vlachs, who for the service were rewarded with benefits and common Vlach law. After many conflicts and death of last noble Nelipić, then Ivan Frankopan, Vlachs supported Stjepan Vukčić Kosača. The ridge stećci of Dalmatian type can be found only in regions of Dalmatia and Southwestern Bosnia, parts ruled by the Kosača noble family. It was in his interest to settle militant and well-organized Vlachs in the riskiest part of his realm, to defend from Talovac forces in Cetina and Venice forces in Poljica and the coast. Thus Dalmatian type is found only West and South of Kosača capital Imotski, and later also North after fall of Bosnia. Archeologically, some Middle Age burials from Cetina county have local specifics by which Cetina county differs from other parts of Dalmatia. In the county, the burials were not done in the ground without additional stone architecture. Some scholars related this phenomenon to the specific ethnic identity; however, due to still groundbreaking research, for now, it is considered only a regional and narrow local occurrence.

Anthropological research in 1982 on skeletons from 108 stećak graves (13-14th century) from Raška Gora near Mostar, as well some from Grborezi near Livno, shown homogeneity of the serials with clean Dinaric anthropological type, without other admixtures, presumably indicating an autochthonous Vlach population of non-Slavic origin. The research of 11 skeletons from necropolis at Pavlovac near Prača, often attributed to the Pavlović noble family, also shown clean Dinaric type, indicating Vlach origin, although historical sources do not call Pavlovići as Vlachs. The anthropological research in 1991 on the 40 skeletons from 28 burials (dated 1440-1450s) beneath stećci at plateau Poljanice near the village of Bisko showed that the vast majority of the population belonged to the presumably autochthonous Dinaric type and non-Slavic origin. 21 skeleton belonged to child burial, while of 19 adult burials 13 belonged to males. The quarry for stećci was found in the Northwestern part of the plateau, with one ridge as semi-finished work without any ornament. Although they argue autochthonous Vlach origin since Illyrian times it rather shows continuation of the process of Dinarization and assimilation of Slavs, a characteristic which could be general and not ethnic. The Dinaric racial type is also common in other parts of Europe especially Ukraine and was perceived by some as a Slavic type besides the fact such racial anthropology terminology and methodology is of scientifically highly dubious accuracy and relevancy today. Archaeological artifacts are even more inconclusive because they don't differenate them from graves without tombstones. In 2019 and 2021 studies of late medieval stećak archaeological necropolises Kopošići near Ilijaš and Divičani near Jajce, six samples belonged to Y-DNA haplogroup I2a1b3 and one to R1a, showing continuity between medieval and modern Bosnian and Herzegovinian population. Two of the decorated skeletal remains could indicate identity of Bosnian noblemen Mirko Radojević and his son Batić Mirković who served Bosnian King Tvrtko I.

Legacy
One of their enigmas is the fact they were not mentioned in local and foreign medieval documents. Franciscan chronicles which recorded many unusual things, like Turkish cemetery, did not mention them. Folk tradition preserved mythical perception full of superstitions and fantasy tales. It implies that occurred discontinuity of historical memory among all three ethnic groups, caused by ethnic migrations and religious conversions during the Ottoman occupation. It is considered that the first itinerary mention of stećci is by Benedikt Kuripešić from 1530. Evliya Çelebi in 1626 described them as tombstone monuments of some unknown heroes. The oldest local author to mention them is Andrija Kačić Miošić in the mid-18th century. Alberto Fortis in his work Travels into Dalmatia (1774) recorded them in Romanticist spirit of the time as described the tombstones in Cetina as warrior graves of the giants. They also attracted attention by Aleksander Antoni Sapieha, Ami Boué, Otto Blau, John Gardner Wilkinson and Heinrich Sterneck.

Since the second half of the 19th century, stećci are seen as a symbol of Bosnia and Herzegovina, being objects of South Slavic ideological ethno-national building myths and ownership, as well different opinions on their archaeological, artistic and historical interpretation. The breakup of Yugoslavia and Bosnian War (1992–1995) caused a resurgence of Bosnian, Croatian and Serbian nationalism, in which all three ethnic groups tried to appropriate them as part of their own culture exclusively. Paradoxically, none of these groups in Bosnia and Herzegovina, (Bosniaks, Bosnian Serbs and Bosnian Croats), originally remember them in their collective consciousness, leaving them to deteriorate in nature or to human carelessness and destruction which at least halved the number. This attitude alone implies how such appropriation is based on an ideological construct. According to Marian Wenzel one of the three pervasive ethno-national ideological constructs, specifically the thesis about Bogomil origin of stećci, dates as far back as the last decade of the 19th century when it has been put forward by Austria-Hungarian bureaucracy, namely by a member of the Hungarian parliament Janos von Asboth, in correlation with similar thesis on origin of Muslim inhabitants of Bosnia and Herzegovina as descendants of Bogomils. Such distortion of history will later attract criticism by scholars like Wenzel, who stated that through this particular example Austria-Hungarian authority practically delivered stećci "as a gift to Muslims, emphasizing their inheritance rights to the land and implying that the later Christians, comparatively, were the 'newcomers'". During the war of the 1990s this theory will again have its resurgence in media and public discourse, seeking historical-political legitimacy in which Islamization of local Bosnia and Herzegovina populace was not only caused by Ottoman occupation but also by ingrained religious idiosyncrasy, epitomized in Bogomilsm, thus affirming ethnic and confessional difference between Bogomil population and population of Catholic and Orthodox confession. However, it did not make a significant influence on scientific thinking or scholarship and comparative research in Bosnia and Herzegovina, nor elsewhere.

Europe's first public presentation of the gravestones is attributed to Polish-born Russian immigrant and Yugoslav diplomat, Alexander Soloviev (1890–1971). He apparently wrote about them in the accompanying prospectus of Paris exhibition "Medieval art of the people of Yugoslavia" (1950). The first regional public presentation was held in 2008 at Klovićevi Dvori Gallery, and represented an example of encouraging public dialogue between four nations. They have influenced different art forms and were an inspirational theme for sculptors, painters, poets, filmmakers, writers and photographers.

Notable stećci

Stećci are commonly concentrated in groups: in cemeteries of individual families with few specimens, in cemeteries of whole families with approximately 30 up to 50 specimens, big necropolis of rural districts occasionally with several hundred specimens. Examples of family necropolis are those by Sanković noble family in village Biskup near Konjic, by Miloradović-Stjepanović (Hrabreni) in Radimlja near Stolac, by Pavlović noble family near Sarajevo, and by unknown family at Donja Zgošća near Kakanj. Today many Stećci are also displayed in the garden of the National Museum of Bosnia and Herzegovina in Sarajevo. The medieval Mramorje necropolis in Serbia is part of Monument of Culture of Exceptional Importance and contains large number of stećak tombs. Some other notable or studied individual stećci:
 It is considered that the oldest known stećak is that of Grdeša, a 12th-century župan of Trebinje.
 It is considered that the oldest known stećak with inscription is that of Marija, wife of priest Dabiživ, with inscribed number and presumed year-date 1231, from Vidoštak near Stolac.
 Vlatko Vuković Kosača's grave lies marked near the village of Boljuni near Stolac, Bosnia and Herzegovina, from the late 14th century. The inscription on the grave was written in Bosnian Cyrillic in Ikavian.
 The two ridge stećci which belonged to Jerko Kustražić and his wife Vladna from the mid 15th century, in Cista near Imotski, and Split, Croatia
 The ridge stećak of Vlkoj Bogdanić (son of Radmil) who died in battle in the mid 15th century, made by mason Jurina, in Lovreć, Croatia

UNESCO locations

Gallery

Notes

See also
 Bogomilism
 Bosnian Church
 Vlachs in medieval Bosnia and Herzegovina
 Nada Miletić
 Khachkar

References

Sources

Further reading

External links

 
 

Bogomilism
Burial monuments and structures in Bosnia and Herzegovina
Medieval European sculptures
Rock art in Europe
Rock art in Bosnia and Herzegovina
World Heritage Sites in Bosnia and Herzegovina
World Heritage Sites in Croatia
World Heritage Sites in Montenegro
World Heritage Sites in Serbia
Religion in medieval Bosnia and Herzegovina
Medieval Bosnia and Herzegovina architecture